C. R. Neelakandan is an Indian environmental activist, politician and writer. A a regular contributor to Malayalam periodicals on environmental issues, Neelakandan is a former State Convener of Aam Aadmi Party Kerala.

Biography 
Neelakandan was born to C. P. Raman Namboothiri and Savithri Antharjanam in 1957 at Karuvannoor in Thrissur District, in the south Indian state of Kerala. He completed his education from Christ College, Irinjalakuda and Government Engineering College, Thrissur. He was an activist of SFI at district and state levels while studying. After his academic study, he underwent training at the Bhabha Atomic Research Centre Bombay. Subsequently, he joined Keltron in 1981 and was the Deputy General Manager of Keltron in its Aroor branch at the time of his superannuation in May 2015.

Neelakandan began his political activism in students movement. He was arrested during The Emergency and was held in illegal custody for alleged possession of communist literature. Later he joined Students Federation of India, and also worked in the Communist Party. In 2014, he joined the Aam Admi Party and became a member of the State Executive Committee and, later, its State Convener. However, he parted ways with the party in 2019. He actively participates in environmental issues such as public protest against waste dumping at various places across the state such as Lalur, Vilappilashala, Panamkuttichira, Brahmapuram, Pettippalam etc. Struggles like Silent Valley, National Highway Protection Samithy, Chengara, Plachimada, GAIUL Pipe Line, High Speed Rail Corridor, Many mining projects like Mineral sand mining on Arattupuzha Coast, Moolampilly displacement, Malabar Gold pollution, Periyar River Protection, Endosulfan in Kazaragod, Aranmula Airport, Athirappilly and Pooyamkutty HEPs and many others.

Neelakandan is married to V. M. Girija, a poet and staff of the All India Radio, Kochi. The couple has two daughters, Aardra and Aarcha and the family lives in Kakkanadu, in Kochi.

Books
 Paristhithiyum Aagolavalkaranavum (Environment and Globalisation)
 Prakrthiyude Nilavilikal
 
 
 Paristhithiyude Varthamanangal

Awards
 Baba Award
 Mukundan C. Menon award (2009)
 A. Sujanapal Award
 First Oorja Kerala Award
 Evoorath Award
 Gandhi Darshan Award (2013)

Amnesty International
In 2016, he supported Amnesty international in the controversy against ABVP.

References

External links 

Mathrubhumi, News of attack

Malayali people
1957 births
Living people
Indian environmental writers
Activists from Kerala
Former members of Aam Aadmi Party
21st-century Indian politicians
Politicians from Thrissur
Malayalam-language writers
Writers from Thrissur
Indian anti-globalization activists
20th-century Indian writers
Indian political writers